Christine M. Ahmann-Leighton (married Perham) (born May 20, 1970) is an American former competition swimmer, Olympic champion, and former world record-holder.

Ahmann-Leighton attended the University of Arizona from 1988 to 1992, where she swam for the Arizona Wildcats swimming and diving team in National Collegiate Athletic Association (NCAA) competition.  She won NCAA national championships in the 100-yard butterfly in 1991 and 1992.

She competed at the 1992 Summer Olympics in Barcelona, Spain, where she received three medals.  She won a gold medal by swimming the butterfly leg for the winning U.S. team in the women's 4×100-meter medley relay.  Together with relay teammates Lea Loveless (backstroke), Anita Nall (breaststroke), and Jenny Thompson (freestyle), she set a new world record of 4:02.54 in the event final.  Ahmann-Leighton received another gold medal for swimming for the winning U.S. team in preliminary heats of the women's 4×100-meter freestyle relay.  Individually, she also received a silver medal for her second-place performance in the women's 100-meter butterfly, recording a time of 58.74 seconds in the event final.

See also

 List of Olympic medalists in swimming (women)
 List of University of Arizona people
 List of World Aquatics Championships medalists in swimming (women)
 World record progression 4 × 100 metres medley relay

References

External links

1970 births
Living people
American female butterfly swimmers
American female freestyle swimmers
Arizona Wildcats women's swimmers
World record setters in swimming
Olympic gold medalists for the United States in swimming
Olympic silver medalists for the United States in swimming
People from Yankton, South Dakota
Swimmers at the 1992 Summer Olympics
World Aquatics Championships medalists in swimming
Medalists at the 1992 Summer Olympics